Dust Off the Wings is a 1997 Australian film about a young man struggling to come to terms with his impending marriage.

Production
The film was partly inspired by Lee Rogers' marriage to Kate Ceberano in 1995. The film was shot on digi Betacam in 17 days over several weekends in April and May 1996 at Bondi Beach. Two-thirds of the film was scripted the rest was improvised.

Release
Rogers announced plans to make two sequels, Speck of Dust (to do with pregnancy) and Dust to Dust (to do with death). However, as of 2021 neither had been made.

References

External links

"Dust Off the Wings" at Urban Cinefile
Dust Off the Wings at Oz Movies

Australian drama films
1990s English-language films
1990s Australian films